The GE B23-7 is a diesel locomotive model that was first offered by GE in late 1977. It competed with the very successful EMD GP38-2. General Electric also produced a variant, the BQ23-7, No. 5130-5139, for the Seaboard Coast Line. A total of 537 B23-7's were built for 9 U.S. customers and 2 Mexican customers.

A B23-7A is a 12-cylinder B23-7 with horsepower boosted to 250 per cylinder or 3,000 horsepower.  In 1980 the Missouri Pacific ordered three B23-7A's (#'s 4667-4669, later UP #'s 257-259) and tested them system-wide.  The result was the GE model B30-7A, B30-7 with a 12-cylinder FDL prime mover.  They were not renumbered into the B30-7A series on the MP because they lacked Sentry Wheel Slip and had different engine governors.

13 B23-7's were built by GE of Brazil in Dec.1979 for United South Eastern Railways(FUS) no.522-524 and National Railways of Mexico(NdeM) no.9130-9139. 17 B23-7s were built from GE kits in Mexico as Ferrocarriles Nacionales de México no.10047-10052 and no.12001-12011.

Southern Railway's 54 units had Southern's "standard" high-short-hoods.

Original owners

References

B23-7
B-B locomotives
Diesel-electric locomotives of the United States
Railway locomotives introduced in 1977
Freight locomotives
Standard gauge locomotives of the United States
Standard gauge locomotives of Mexico
5 ft 3 in gauge locomotives
Diesel-electric locomotives of Mexico